Hathras is a Lok Sabha parliamentary constituency in Uttar Pradesh.

Assembly segments
The Hathras Lok Sabha constituency comprises 5 legislative assembly segments:

Members of Parliament

Election results

2019

2014

See also
 Hathras
 List of Constituencies of the Lok Sabha

References

Lok Sabha constituencies in Uttar Pradesh
Hathras district